The Sigma 50-500mm 4-6.3 EX DG HSM is a super-telephoto zoom lens produced by Sigma Corporation. It is commonly known as the "Bigma" because of its long and heavy body. It contains four SLD (Special Low Dispersion) glass elements to provide correction for chromatic aberration. It is aimed at advanced consumers.

Editions 
The Bigma was originally released by Sigma in 2001. Over the years, it has gone through several iterations and improvements. This includes the 2006 DG model which is optimized for digital cameras. In 2010, Sigma added built-in optical stabilization (OS) to the Bigma.

See also
List of Nikon F-mount lenses with integrated autofocus motors
 Sigma 200–500mm f/2.8 EX DG lens
 Sigma 300–800mm f/5.6 EX DG HSM lens (a.k.a. the Sigmonster)

References

050-500mm f/4-6.3 DG
Camera lenses introduced in 2001